Anthony Xu Ji-wei (April 2, 1934 – September 25, 2016) was a Roman Catholic bishop.

Biography
Xu was born in Shanghai in 1934 with ancestral ties to Ningbo and undertook seminary training from 1948 to 1958.

Xu was sentenced to 5 years of hard labour in 1960. He was ordained to the priesthood in 1985, Xu Ji-wei served as bishop of the Roman Catholic Diocese of Taizhou, China from 2010 to 2016.

Xu was provincial director of the Catholic Patriotic Association and member of the Standing Committee of the CPPCC.

Notes

1934 births
2016 deaths
21st-century Roman Catholic bishops in China
Bishops of the Catholic Patriotic Association
Prisoners and detainees of the People's Republic of China